The Dream of X is a novella by English writer William Hope Hodgson, an abridged version of his 1912 science fiction novel The Night Land.

The abridgment was originally published as part of the chapbook collection Poems and the Dream of X in 1912 by R. Harold Paget.

It was first published as a stand-alone book in 1977 by Donald M. Grant, Publisher, Inc. with an introduction by Sam Moskowitz. It was published in an edition of 2,220 copies.

Securing copyright for The Night Land 
Hodgson's novel The Night Land was published in England in 1912. At that time, copyright in the United States could not be obtained until the book was printed within the US. Hodgson was unable to find an American publisher for his 200,000-word novel. In order to ensure the copyright, he revised and abridged the novel, condensing it to 20,000 words. He then financed the printing himself through publisher R. Harold Paget, securing the US copyright.

Sources

1912 British novels
1912 science fiction novels
Novels by William Hope Hodgson
Dying Earth (genre)
Donald M. Grant, Publisher books